Michaelis is a brand of dictionaries of the Portuguese language published in Brazil by Melhoramentos. Under this brand are also books about the grammar of a variety of foreign languages. The first Michaelis dictionary was created by the end of the 19th century by the German lexicographer Henriette Michaelis in a partnership with her sister Carolina Michaelis de Vasconcelos.

The dictionary has versions in Portuguese, English, Spanish, Italian, French, German and Japanese.

Controversy 
In July 2015, an online petition by the LGBT community was created demanding the dictionary to review the definition of "marriage". The definition was, among others, a "legitimate union between man and woman". The petition requested that the word "people" were used instead of "man" and "woman". The petition got more than three thousand endorsements. The director of Melhoramentos made the requested changes.

See also 
 Aurélio Dictionary

References

External links 

Portuguese dictionaries